The Norstedt Building is the main office of P.A. Norstedt & Söner AB on Riddarholmen in Stockholm, Sweden.

Designed by Magnus Isæus the building was built in 1882–1891, and features a spire-like roof, which is a well-known silhouette on the skyline of central Stockholm. The Vasabron Bridge passes in front of the building and Gamla Riksarkivet ("Old National Archive") lies south of it.

See also 
 Architecture of Stockholm
 List of streets and squares in Gamla stan

Notes

References 
 

Buildings and structures in Stockholm
Office buildings in Sweden